Antidoto (Greek: Αντιδοτο) is the name of a Greek album by singer Anna Vissi released in Greece and Cyprus in 1998. The album reached 4× Platinum status and is the first album in Greek music history to sell 80,000 copies in the first week of its release. The album was also released in international packaging in France, Germany, and South Africa.

Album information

Background
The album was recorded in London during 1997 where Nikos Karvelas lived at the time. When Vissi was performing in Athens and would head off to London on her days off to record the album. "Gazi" was the first song she presented to the public during her gigs in Gazi Club in Athens in winter 1997–1998 season. The cover of Antidoto was made by a photograph from the booklet of the album Travma which was reversed and edited. Additional photos in the booklet were captured from the music video of Erotevmenaki. This album includes a duet with Paris Karagiannopoulos titled "Magava Tout" which was made a single in the summer. The CD was an enhanced CD format release which included the music video of the second single "Erotevmenaki". The album was packaged in two versions; the one on paperback, gatefold cover, the other in conventional jewel case. Both versions included the music video of the track "Erotevmenaki" as a free bonus.

In early 2019, a vinyl release for the album was scheduled. Later in the same year, the album was selected for inclusion in the Panik Gold box set The Legendary Recordings 1982-2019. The release came after Panik's acquisition rights of Vissi's back catalogue from her previous record company Sony Music Greece. This box set was printed on a limited edition of 500 copies containing CD releases of all of her albums from 1982 to 2019 plus unreleased material.

Sales
It became the fastest selling album until then in Greece selling more than 80,000 copies in the first week of its release. It also stands as the first album in Greek music history to become platinum in the first week of its release.

Music
Music and lyrics are by Nikos Karvelas, Natalia Germanou (Track 14 - lyrics) and Apostolos Diavolikis (Track 07 - lyrics)

Track listing 
 "Erotevmenaki" (My little love)
 "S' Eho Epithimisi" (I've missed you)
 "Methismeni Mou Kardia" (My drunken heart)
 "Gazi" (Gas)
 "Antidoto" (Antidote)
 "Magava Tout (Thelo Esena)" (Duet with Paris Karagiannopoulos) (Magava Tout (I want you))
 "Pali Yia Sena" (Again for you)
 "O Telefteos Stathmos" (Terminal stop)
 "Gi 'Alla" (For others)
 "Mou Anikis" (You belong to me)
 "O Ponos Tis Agapis" (The pain of love)
 "Denome" (Attached)
 "Tilefonaki" (Mobile phone)
 "Na Ton Agapas" (To love him)

Singles
 "S' Eho Epithimisi"
 "Erotevmenaki"
 "Magava Tout"
 "Pali Gia Sena"
 "Gazi"
 "Antidoto"
 "Mou Anikis"
 "Methismeni Mou Kardia"

Music Videos
"Erotevmenaki", "S' Eho Epithimisi", "Pali Gia Sena", "Magava Tout", "Mou Anikis" and "Methismeni Mou Kardia" were released on promotional videos during 1998, airing in local TV stations. 

In 2001, "Erotevmenaki", "S' Eho Epithimisi" and "Mou Anikis" were selected for digital release on Vissi's The Video Collection.

Credits and personnel

Personnel
Giorgos Athanasoulas - violin 
Apostolos Diavolikis - lyrics 
Natalia Germanou - lyrics 
Paris Karagiannopoulos - vocals on track “Magkava Tout”
Nikos Karvelas - music, lyrics, acoustic guitar
Jamal Kashad - percussions 
Lampis Kemanetzidis - clarinet 
Dimitris Koliakoudakis - classic guitar 
Takis Kouvatseas - drums 
Yiannis Lionakis - guitars, bouzouki, lute, tzouras, baglamas, üti
Theodoros Matoulas - harp 
Kostas Miliotakis - keyboards 
Christos Olympios - tzouras
Giorgos Tsolakos - keyboards
Harry Tsirekas - crashes
Nikos Vardis - bass 
Anna Vissi - vocals

Production
Nikos Karvelas - production management, arrangements, instrumentation, instrument playing
Giorgos Ragkos - recording engineering, mixing at Studio Echo Recording
Yiannis Ioannidis - digital mastering & CD-EXTRA pre-mastering at Digital Press Hellas
Petros Siakavelas - digital mastering & CD-EXTRA pre-mastering at D.P.H.

Design
Tasos Vrettos - cover photo
Giorgos Chrysochoïdis - inlay photos
Yiannis Angelakis - make up
Stephanos Vasilakis - hair styling
Katerina Sideridou - cover design
Michalis Orfanos - cover printing

Credits adapted from the album's liner notes.

Charts

References 

Anna Vissi albums
1998 albums
Greek-language albums
Sony Music Greece albums
Albums produced by Nikos Karvelas